Potenciano Lesaca was a Filipino politician and businessman who became the first civil governor of Zambales, a province of the Philippines in the Central Luzon region. He served from 1901 to 1903, and was the first governor of the American era. His brother, Juan Lesaca, was governor from 1910 to 1916.

From 1935 to 1938, he represented Zambales at the 1st National Assembly of the Philippines. This meeting of the legislature of the Commonwealth of the Philippines passed a total of 415 laws.

References

Governors of Zambales
Members of the House of Representatives of the Philippines from Zambales
Members of the National Assembly of the Philippines
1871 births
Year of death missing